Daisy Irani Shukla (born 17 June 1950) is an Indian actress in Hindi and Telugu language films. She was a popular child actor in the 1950s and 1960s. She is most known for films such as Bandish (1955), Ek Hi Raasta (1956), Naya Daur (1957), Hum Panchhi Ek Daal Ke (1957), Jailor (1958), Qaidi No. 911 (1959) and Do Ustad (1959). As a supporting actress, she acted in Kati Patang in 1971. She also worked in a popular TV show Shararat.

Background and personal life
Irani was born into a Zoroastrian family and her mother-tongue is Gujarati. She is the eldest of three sisters, the other two being Honey Irani and Menaka Irani. Her younger sister Honey, who was also a child-star, went on to marry script-writer Javed Akhtar and is the mother of Farhan Akhtar and Zoya Akhtar. Irani's other sister, Menaka, is married to the stunt film-maker Kamran Khan (film producer) and is the mother of film-makers Sajid Khan and Farah Khan.

Daisy married screenwriter K. K. Shukla, on 21 January 1971 at age 21. She acted as a child-star in industry. She has three children, a son named Kabir and two daughters, Varsha and Ritu. None of her children are involved with the entertainment industry in any capacity.

Although born a Zoroastrian, Daisy grew interested in Christianity later in life. In 1975, she became a member of New Life Fellowship in Mumbai.

In 2018, Daisy revealed that she had been raped at the age of 6 by her "guardian" during the making of Hum Panchhi Ek Daal Ke (1957).

Career
During the Golden Age (1950s–70s) of Hindi cinema, some child stars had great visibility. The Irani sisters, Daisy and Honey, who generally played boys with curly hair, became household names. The films that had both of them fetched the biggest openings. Stories were re-written to include them in the cast or increase their footage, and they were prominently publicized in the promos of their movies. Their most-remembered movies, together or separate, include Bandish, Jagte Raho, Bhai Bhai, Naya Daur, Hum Panchi Ek Daal Ke, Musafir, Sahara,  Duniya Na Mane, Do Ustad, Dhool Ka Phool, Soorat Aur Seerat and Chandi Ki Diwar. Daisy, who was more popular than her younger sister as a child artiste, continued to act after growing up, though not in any significant roles.

She quit films after her marriage in 1971, with her last release being Kati Patang in 1971. In the 1980s, she worked in theatre for a while and started an acting school. After the death of her husband in the early 1990s, she returned to acting in the comedy TV series Dekh Bhai Dekh and films such as Aastha (1997), Kya Kehna and Shararat (2002).

She appeared in nephew Sajid Khan's 2010 Housefull and thereafter in niece Farah Khan's acting debut film Shirin Farhad Ki Toh Nikal Padi (2012), directed by Bela Sehgal.

Filmography

 Bandish (1955)
 Jagte Raho (1956)
 Ek Hi Raasta (1956) Raja 
 Devta (1956)
 Bhai-Bhai (1956) Munna
 Suvarna Sundari (1957)
 Naya Daur (1957)
 Musafir (1957)
 Hum Panchhi Ek Daal Ke (1957) Chatpat
 Bhabhi (1957) Mithu
 Yaar Paiyyan (1957) Poori 
 Talaaq (1958)
 Sahara (1958)
 Panchayat (1958)
 Jailor (1958)
 Detective (1958)
 Raj Tilak (1958)
 Qaidi No. 911 (1959) Guddu
 Kangan (1959)
 Duniya Na Mane (1959)
 Do Ustad (1959) Raja
 Dhool Ka Phool (1959) Ramesh
 Chirag Kahan Roshni Kahan (1959)
 Bhai Bahen (1959)
 Kumkuma Rekha (1960) (Telugu)
 Sharabi (1964)
 Arzoo (1965)
 Kade Dhupp Kade Chhaan (1967) Punjani Movie 
 Nawab Sirazuddaula (1967)
 Ankhen (1968) Lily
 Talash (1969)
 Pehchan (1970) Rani
 Kati Patang (1970) Ramaiah
 Geet (1970) Laxminarayan's daughter
 Jwala (1971)
 Gomti Ke Kinare (1972) Chandni
 Ahankaar (1995) Naina's Mom
 Aastha: In the Prison of Spring (1997) Reena
 Mujhe Meri Biwi Se Bachaao (2001)
 Sanjivani (2002) Nurse Philo
 Shararat (2002) Rani Devi
 San Ge Hao Ren (2005)
 Anjaane (2005)
 Housefull (2010) Batook's mother
 Dil Toh Baccha Hai Ji (2011) June 's grandmother
 Shirin Farhad Ki Toh Nikal Padi (2012) Nargis Pastakia
 Happy New Year (2014) Tammy's Mother (Cameo Appearance)

References

External links
 

1950 births
Living people
Irani people
20th-century Indian actresses
Indian film actresses
Place of birth missing (living people)
Actresses in Hindi cinema
Indian child actresses
Indian Christians
Converts to Christianity from Zoroastrianism
21st-century Indian actresses
Gujarati people
Actresses in Tamil cinema